Sorencio Juliaans (born 4 March 1997) is a Surinamese footballer who currently plays for S.V. Transvaal and the Suriname national football team.

At the youth level he played in 2011 CONCACAF U-17 Championship qualifiers at the age of 13, scoring against Saint Vincent and the Grenadines. He played in the same event two years later.

References

External links

Caribbean football database profile

1997 births
Living people
Surinamese footballers
Suriname international footballers
Suriname youth international footballers
Association football midfielders
S.V. Transvaal players
SVB Eerste Divisie players